West Point is a city in and the county seat of Cuming County, Nebraska, United States. The population was 3,504 at the 2020 census.

History
West Point was first founded in the spring of 1857, when Omaha businessmen formed the Nebraska Settlement Association in order to find suitable townsites in the Elkhorn Valley.  Uriah, John, and Andrew Bruner (three brothers originally from Pennsylvania), and William Sexauer chose the present location on a bend along a river, which they called New Philadelphia. The name was soon changed to West Point because it was the westernmost outpost along the valley.

West Point became the county seat of Cuming County on October 12, 1858 after winning the election over the community of DeWitt.  A total of 19 votes were split between the two towns with West Point obtaining 12 votes.  By the spring of 1859, over 4,000 Pawnee natives flooded the Elkhorn Valley during a hunting excursion and, displeased to find white settlers in the valley, burned several homesteads and killed livestock.  The so-called Pawnee War ended near Battle Creek without a fight.

West Point grew slowly at first, but with the coming of the railroad in 1870, it boomed to a population of over 700.

By the mid-1970s, the future of railroad service came into question.  The Chicago & North Western tracks had been experiencing mildly declining freight traffic volumes.  Revenue railroad service ultimately ended in spring of 1982, when flooding from the Elkhorn River damaged sections of the track.  With freight traffic mildly declining & flooding damage, the C&NW promptly filed a request with the Interstate Commerce Commission to abandon the line.  Permission was granted a short time later, leaving the tracks with a dismal future.  Plans were made to revive railroad service from the newly formed Fremont & Elkhorn Valley Railroad, who purchased the abandoned C&NW track.  However, the costs were too high to revive railroad service, and the tracks were removed in 1988.

On August 26, 2019, the DHHS announced that the city's water was unsafe to drink after a year of complaints from citizens of the town. The maximum safe level of manganese for infants had been exceeded by over 700 micrograms per mL.

Geography
West Point is located at  (41.839635, -96.711406).

West Point lies on the eastern bank of the Elkhorn River.

Climate

Demographics

2010 census
As of the census of 2010, there were 3,364 people, 1,432 households, and 899 families living in the city. The racial makeup of the city was 87.7% White, 0.3% African American, 0.4% Native American, 0.3% Asian, 0.1% Pacific Islander, 10.3% from other races, and 1.0% from two or more races. Hispanic or Latino of any race were 16.8% of the population.

There were 1,432 households, of which 27.4% had children under the age of 18 living with them, 52.0% were married couples living together, 7.3% had a female householder with no husband present, 3.5% had a male householder with no wife present, and 37.2% were non-families. 34.1% of all households were made up of individuals, and 19.4% had someone living alone who was 65 years of age or older. The average household size was 2.31 and the average family size was 2.97.

The median age in the city was 43.2 years. 25.5% of residents were under the age of 18; 5.4% were between the ages of 18 and 24; 20.9% were from 25 to 44; 25.6% were from 45 to 64; and 22.6% were 65 years of age or older. The gender makeup of the city was 48.1% male and 51.9% female.

2000 census
As of the census of 2000, there were 3,660 people, 1,432 households, and 946 families living in the city. The population density was 1,479.2 people per square mile (572.1/km). There were 1,552 housing units at an average density of 627.3 per square mile (242.6/km). The racial makeup of the city was 92.02% White, 0.22% African American, 0.41% Native American, 0.16% Asian, 5.74% from other races, and 1.45% from two or more races. Hispanic or Latino of any race were 12.02% of the population.

There were 1,432 households, out of which 30.7% had children under the age of 18 living with them, 56.7% were married couples living together, 6.7% had a female householder with no husband present, and 33.9% were non-families. 30.2% of all households were made up of individuals, and 18.1% had someone living alone who was 65 years of age or older. The average household size was 2.45 and the average family size was 3.04.

In the city, the population was spread out, with 25.1% under the age of 18, 7.0% from 18 to 24, 25.0% from 25 to 44, 19.6% from 45 to 64, and 23.2% who were 65 years of age or older. The median age was 40 years. For every 100 females, there were 96.8 males. For every 100 females age 18 and over, there were 92.3 males.

As of 2000 the median income for a household in the city was $32,616, and the median income for a family was $38,702. Males had a median income of $27,981 versus $20,774 for females. The per capita income for the city was $19,053. About 5.4% of families and 9.0% of the population were below the poverty line, including 8.9% of those under age 18 and 6.8% of those age 65 or over.

Notable people
Richard C. Hunter, U.S. Senator from Nebraska
Eldon Johnson, Oregon state legislator.
Karl H. Timmermann, who led the initial assault on the Ludendorff Bridge at Remagen, and was the first American officer to cross the River Rhine into Germany during WWII.
Nick Krajicek, Air Force Thunderbirds pilot
Lawrence Bruner, internationally recognized entomologist from the University of Nebraska.

References

External links
 City website
 West Point News

Cities in Cuming County, Nebraska
Cities in Nebraska
County seats in Nebraska
1857 establishments in Nebraska Territory
Populated places established in 1857